Whinnen is a surname. Notable people with the surname include:

 George Whinnen (1891–1950), Australian painter
 Mel Whinnen (born 1942), Australian footballer